The Georgia Fire were a professional indoor football team based in Rome, Georgia. They were members of the American Conference in the Professional Indoor Football League (PIFL) during the 2014 season.

The Fire joined the PIFL in 2014 as an expansion team, after the PIFL was forced to find a replacement team for the Albany Panthers, who were kicked out of their home arena by city official in Albany. They are the latest franchise to play indoor football after the Rome Renegades of the now-defunct National Indoor Football League (NIFL).

The Fire played their home games at the Forum Civic Center in Rome.

Franchise history

With complications surrounding the Albany Panthers franchise for the 2014 season, the Professional Indoor Football League (PIFL) introduced the Fire to replace the Panthers for the 2014 season. With the league running the team, PIFL Executive Director, Jeff Ganos was named the franchise's general manager and Cosmo DeMatteo was named the team's innaurgal head coach on February 27, 2014. With the season starting on April 5, 2014, the Fire were given the Panthers roster, where players who didn't wish to play for the new franchise, refused to report. In the first game in franchise history, the Fire knocked off defending PIFL Champions, the Alabama Hammers by a score of 57-55.

Players of note

Final roster

All-League players
The following Fire players were named to All-League Teams:
 WR Johnny Lester, John Harris
 OL Aaron Wheeler
 LB Adrian McLeod

Coaches of note

Head coaches

Coaching staff

Season-by-season results

References

External links 
 
 Official Facebook

 
2014 establishments in Georgia (U.S. state)
2014 disestablishments in Georgia (U.S. state)